Amin al-tojar Caravansarai  is a caravanserai related to the Qajar dynasty and is located in Kashmar. This Caravansarai is opposite the Jameh Mosque of Kashmar.

See also 
 Arg of Kashmar

Sources 

Caravanserais in Iran
Architecture in Iran
Buildings and structures in Kashmar
National works of Iran
Tourist attractions in Razavi Khorasan Province